Wilder is an English and German surname, sometimes used as a given name, meaning "untamed" or "wild", a wild, free, or natural state or existence, also passionately eager or enthusiastic.

People with the given name
 Wilder D. Baker (1890–1975), United States Navy admiral
 Wilder Dwight Bancroft (1867–1953), American chemist
 Wilder Calderón, Peruvian politician
 Wilder Cartagena (born 1994), Peruvian footballer
 Wilder W. Crane Jr. (1928–1985), American politician
 Wilder D. Foster (1819–1873), American politician
 Wilder Guisao (born 1991), Colombian footballer
 Wilder W. Hartley (1901–1970), American politician
 Wilder Hobson (1906–1964), American writer and musician
 Wilder Medina (born 1981), Colombian footballer
 Wilder Metcalf (1855–1935), United States Army general and politician
 Wilder Penfield (1891–1976), American-Canadian neurosurgeon
 Wilder Smith (1835–1891), American minister and writer
 Wilder Weir (born 1983), Canadian television host
 Wilder Zabala (born 1982), Bolivian footballer

People with the surname

The arts

Acting and filmmaking
 Billy Wilder (1906–2002), Austrian-born American film director
 Gene Wilder (1933–2016), American actor
 James Wilder (actor) (born 1968), American film and television actor
 W. Lee Wilder (1904–1982), Austrian-born American screenwriter, film producer and director

Literature
 Charlotte Frances Wilder (1839–1916), American writer
 Cherry Wilder, pseudonym of New Zealand writer Cherry Barbara Grimm (1930–2002)
 Effie Wilder (1909–2007), American writer
 Laura Ingalls Wilder (1867–1957), American writer
 Louise Beebe Wilder (1878–1938), American gardening writer
 Rose Wilder Lane (1886–1968), American writer
 Thornton Wilder (1897–1975), American writer

Music
 Ace Wilder (born 1982), Swedish singer
 Alan Wilder (born 1959), British electronic musician
 Alec Wilder (1907–1980), American composer and songwriter
 Matthew Wilder (born 1953), American musician
 Webb Wilder (born 1954), American singer-songwriter

Military and politics
 Abel Carter Wilder (1828–1875), American businessman and politician
 Douglas Wilder (born 1931), American politician, Governor of Virginia
 Harvey A. Wilder (1907-1968), American farmer and politician
 John Shelton Wilder (1921–2010), American politician, Lieutenant Governor of Tennessee
 John T. Wilder (1830–1917), American Civil War general
 Wilber Elliott Wilder (1857–1952), American brigadier general

Sports
 Bobby Wilder (born 1964), head coach of the Old Dominion Monarchs football team
 Chris Wilder (born 1967), English football player and manager
 Dash Wilder (born 1987), American professional wrestler
 Deontay Wilder (born 1985), American heavyweight boxer
 George Wilder (cricketer) (1876–1948), English cricketer
 James Wilder Sr. (born 1958), American football running back
 James Wilder Jr. (born 1992), American football running back
 Michael Wilder (born 1962), American chess champion

Others
 Burt Green Wilder (1841–1925), American comparative anatomist
 Christopher Wilder (1944–1984), American serial rapist and murderer
 Frances Farmer Wilder, American radio executive
 George Wilder (criminal) (born 1962), prison escaper and New Zealand folk hero
 Gertrude B. Wilder (1874–1955), American clubwoman
 Harris Hawthorne Wilder (1864–1928), American zoologist
 Inez Whipple Wilder (1871–1929), American zoologist
 John R. Wilder (1816–1879), American businessman
 J. Welles Wilder, Jr. (1935–2021), American mechanical engineer, best known for his work in technical analysis
 Lynn Wilder (born 1952), American author and professor
 Nicholas Wilder (1937–1989), American art dealer and gallery owner
 Raymond Louis Wilder (1896–1982), American mathematician
 Robert Wilder (born 1960), American businessman, creator of WilderHill Clean Energy Index
 Russell Morse Wilder (1885–1959), American physician and medical researcher

Fictional Characters 

 Alex Wilder, a fictional character appearing in Marvel Comics.
 Harry Wilder, a fictional character in the Case Closed
 Wilder (Transformers), a fictional character
 Zelos Wilder, a fictional character in the video game Tales of Symphonia

See also
 Wild (surname)
 Wilde
 Wilder (disambiguation)

References

English-language masculine given names
Surnames of English origin